The Nubian giraffe (Giraffa camelopardalis or Giraffa camelopardalis camelopardalis), also known as Baringo giraffe or Ugandan giraffe is the nominate subspecies or species of giraffe. It is found in Ethiopia, Kenya, Uganda, South Sudan and Sudan. It is currently extinct in the wild of the Democratic Republic of Congo, Egypt and Eritrea. The Nubian giraffe used to be widespread in northeast Africa. The subspecies was listed as Critically Endangered by the IUCN in 2018 for the first time due to a 95% decline in the past three decades.

Taxonomy and evolution
The IUCN currently recognizes only one species of giraffe with nine subspecies, one of which is the Nubian giraffe. The Nubian giraffe, along with the whole species, were first known by the binomen Cervus camelopardalis described by Swedish zoologist Carl Linnaeus in the Systema Naturæ per regna tria naturæ, secundum classes, ordines, genera, species, cum characteribus, differentiis, synonymis, locis in 1758. He described the giraffe from Ethiopia or Sennar of Eastern Sudan.

Following Linnaeus's description of the Nubian giraffe, several specimens were described by other naturalists and zoologists since the end of the 18th century under different scientific names, which are all considered synonyms of Giraffa camelopardalis camelopardalis today:
G. c. aethiopicus by Ogilby, 1836
G. c. senaariensis by Trouessart, 1898
G. c. typica by Bryden, 1899
G. c. congoensis by Lydekker, 1903

A 2016 analysis of giraffe subspecies proposed that the Rothschild's giraffe (G. c. rothschildi) could be considered a conspecific ecotype of the Nubian giraffe, but these results are not definitive.

Physical description
The Nubian giraffe has sharply defined chestnut-colored spots surrounded by mostly white lines, while undersides lack spotting. The median lump is particularly developed in the male giraffe.
The most extraordinary characteristic of the Nubian giraffe is that the extreme length of the forelegs gives the animal a huge stride, so that in spite of a rather slow galloping rhythm it can move at speeds up to 30 miles per hour.

Habitat population
Giraffes occurred everywhere in Africa; the Nubian giraffe was widespread throughout North Africa, from Kenya to Egypt. The giraffe lives in savannahs and woodlands. The Nubian giraffe currently lives in eastern South Sudan and southwestern Ethiopia, and isolated pockets in Uganda and Kenya. It was estimated in 2010 that fewer than 250 live in the wild, although this number was uncertain. However, as of 2016, it was estimated that 2,150 Nubian giraffes live in the wild, 1,500 of those of the Rothschild's ecotype. Fewer than 200 now live in western Ethiopia and about 450 in eastern South Sudan. There are 800 in Kenya and more than 1,550 in Uganda.

In captivity

If the Rothschild's giraffe is considered synonymous with the Nubian giraffe, then this taxon is one of the most common giraffe types present in captivity, in conjunction with the reticulated giraffe. If it isn't however, as of 2003 the Al Ain Zoo in the United Arab Emirates is one of the very few zoos to be breeding the animals. The Nubian giraffe is also breeding in captivity in Giza Zoo, Egypt.

See also
Zarafa (giraffe), the most famous of three Nubian giraffes gifted from Muhammad Ali of Egypt to European rulers in 1827

References

External links
 
 

Giraffes
Mammals described in 1758
Taxa named by Carl Linnaeus
Herbivorous mammals
Mammals of North Africa
Mammals of Sudan
Mammals of Ethiopia